The Northern Ireland House of Commons existed from 1921 to 1973 as the lower House of the devolved legislature of the part of the United Kingdom called Northern Ireland.

As in the UK Parliament the constituencies were classified as borough, county or university constituencies.

In 1921–29 the 52 provincial  Members of Parliament were elected using proportional representation by the single transferable vote in multi member constituencies. The constituencies which returned one or two members to the UK Parliament, between 1922 and 1950, were used for Northern Ireland devolved elections in the 1921–29 period.

Between 1929 and 1969 there were 48 single member constituencies, using the first past the post method of election. The non-territorial University constituency continued to return 4 members using the single transferable vote.

For the 1969 election 4 new territorial constituencies were created to replace the University seats. The 52 constituencies ceased to exist after the Parliament of Northern Ireland was suspended in 1972 and abolished in 1973.

Historical representation by party

Antrim

Belfast

Down

Fermanagh and Tyrone

Londonderry

Queen's University 

Sources:
 Northern Ireland Parliamentary Election Results 1921–1972, compiled and edited by Sydney Elliott (Political Reference Publications 1973)
 For the exact definition of constituency boundaries see http://www.election.demon.co.uk/stormont/boundaries.html